Jesse Lemar Gonder (January 20, 1936 – November 14, 2004) was an American professional baseball player. A catcher and pinch hitter, he played in Major League Baseball from 1960 to 1967 for the New York Yankees, Cincinnati Reds, New York Mets, Milwaukee Braves and Pittsburgh Pirates. He played for Baseball Hall of Fame manager Casey Stengel with both the Yankees (1960) and Mets (1963–65).

He was born in Monticello, Arkansas, but attended McClymonds High School in Oakland, California, alma mater of Basketball Hall of Fame center Bill Russell, as well as two of Gonder's future MLB teammates, Frank Robinson and Vada Pinson. Gonder signed with Cincinnati in 1955 and began his 15-year professional career. He was a member of the Yankees for the first weeks of the  season as a pinch hitter before being sent back to Richmond for the rest of the year. The Reds then reacquired Gonder in an off-season trade for pitcher Marshall Bridges.

Assigned to the Triple-A San Diego Padres, Gonder led the  Pacific Coast League in batting (.342) and runs batted in (116) and was named the PCL's most valuable player. He was recalled by Cincinnati that September, then spent the following four full seasons in the National League.

Gonder reverted to part-time status in 1965, and for the remainder of his big-league career played behind regular catchers Chris Cannizzaro, Joe Torre and Jim Pagliaroni.  He was sent to Triple-A in June 1967 and wrapped up his pro career in 1969.

In the Majors, Gonder collected 220 hits, including 28 doubles, two triples and 26 home runs.  Five of those home runs came as a pinch hitter.

References

External links

1936 births
2004 deaths
20th-century African-American sportspeople
21st-century African-American people
African-American baseball players
American expatriate baseball players in Mexico
Baseball players from Arkansas
Cincinnati Reds players
Clovis Pioneers players
Columbus Jets players
Havana Sugar Kings players
Major League Baseball catchers
Milwaukee Braves players
New York Mets players
Ogden Reds players
Pacific Coast League MVP award winners
Phoenix Giants players
Pittsburgh Pirates players
Port Arthur Sea Hawks players
Richmond Braves players
Richmond Virginians (minor league) players
San Antonio Missions players
San Diego Padres (minor league) players
Seattle Angels players
Seattle Rainiers players
Baseball players from Oakland, California
Sultanes de Monterrey players
Temple Redlegs players
Wausau Lumberjacks players
Wenatchee Chiefs players
American expatriate baseball players in Cuba